Nanshan Temple is a Buddhist temple in the foothills of Mount Danxia to the south of Zhangzhou City, Fujian Province, People's Republic of China. It is one of the most important Chinese Buddhism temples on the Chinese mainland.

History
Originally known as the Baoqu Institute, the temple was built during the reign of Emperor Xuanzong of Tang during his Kaiyuan era and completed in 736 CE. In 968 CE during the reign of Emperor Taizu of Song it was repaired by the provincial governor Chen Wen and renamed Chongfu Temple. Later on during the Ming dynasty, its name changed once more to the current "Nanshan Temple".

Description
Nanshan Temple is built in the typical style with the central axis divided into the Hall of the Four Heavenly Kings, the Mahavira Hall and a
the Monasterial Library for the storage of sacred Buddhist scriptures. Within this library there is a large stone Buddha as well as a white jade one that was brought from Myanmar during the Qing dynasty (1644–1911), a large clock and a Ming dynasty (1368–1644)  Avatamsaka Sutra. Together with a sutra written on palm leaves by the Qing Guangxu Emperor, these items are known as the "Five Treasures of Nanshan".

See also
 Guanghua Temple

References

Buddhist temples in Fujian
8th-century establishments in China
Religious buildings and structures completed in 736